Cochylis philypna is a species of moth of the family Tortricidae. It is found in Brazil, where it is found from Minas Gerais to Goias.

References

Moths described in 1994
Cochylis